Talen is a given name and surname. Notable people with the name include:

Given name
 Talen Horton-Tucker (born 2000), American basketball player

Surname
 Bill Talen, American performer and playwright of Reverend Billy and the Church of Stop Shopping
 Bjørn Talén (1890–1945), opera singer
 John Talen (born 1965), cyclist
 Julie Talen, filmmaker
 Rebecca Talen (born 1993), cyclist
 Dick Talens (born 1986), entrepreneur and fitness coach

See also
Talin (disambiguation), includes a list of people with the name Talin
Talon (surname)
, list of characters with the name Talon